Podabrus cavicollis is a species of soldier beetle in the family Cantharidae. It is found in North America.

Subspecies
These two subspecies belong to the species Podabrus cavicollis:
 Podabrus cavicollis cavicollis
 Podabrus cavicollis hatchi

References

Further reading

 

Cantharidae
Articles created by Qbugbot
Beetles described in 1851